George Brydges Rodney (April 2, 1803 – June 18, 1883) was an American lawyer and politician from New Castle, in New Castle County, Delaware. He was a member of the Whig Party, who served as United States Representative from Delaware.

Early life and family

Rodney was born April 2, 1803, in Lewes,  Delaware, son of Governor Daniel Rodney and Sarah Fisher.  He graduated from Princeton College in 1820, studied law and was admitted to the Delaware Bar in 1828, and began practice in New Castle County, Delaware.

His son, also named George Brydges Rodney, served as governor of Alaska for four months in 1874.

Political career
Rodney served as Register in Chancery and Clerk of the Orphans’ Court of Sussex County from 1826 until 1830. He was elected as a Whig and served four years representing Delaware in the U.S. House of Representatives during the 27th and 28th Congress from March 4, 1841, until March 3, 1845, during the administrations of U.S. Presidents William Henry Harrison and John Tyler. Following his retirement he resumed the practice of law and served as a delegate to the peace convention held in Washington, D.C., in 1861 in an effort to prevent the impending Civil War.

Death and legacy
Rodney died at New Castle and is buried there in the Immanuel Episcopal Church Cemetery.

Almanac
Elections are held the first Tuesday after November 1. U.S. Representatives took office March 4 and have a two-year term.

References

External links
Biographical Directory of the U.S. Congress 
Delaware's Members of Congress

The Political Graveyard

Places with more information
Delaware Historical Society; website; 505 North Market Street, Wilmington, Delaware 19801; (302) 655-7161
University of Delaware; Library website; 181 South College Avenue, Newark, Delaware 19717; (302) 831-2965

1803 births
1883 deaths
People from New Castle, Delaware
Princeton University alumni
Delaware lawyers
Delaware Whigs
Members of the United States House of Representatives from Delaware
Burials in New Castle County, Delaware
Whig Party members of the United States House of Representatives
19th-century American politicians
19th-century American lawyers
Rodney family of Delaware